Whidden & Lewis was an architectural firm based in Portland, Oregon, in the United States, around the beginning of the 20th century, formed by William M. Whidden and Ion Lewis.  The partnership was established in 1889. Their residential buildings were mostly in the Colonial Revival style, while their commercial buildings were primarily in the 20th-century classical style.  The commercial buildings often featured brick, along with terra cotta ornamentation. Many of their buildings are listed on the National Register of Historic Places (NRHP).

NRHP works in Portland

 Charles F. Adams House
 Ayer–Shea House
 Bates–Seller House
 Philip Buehner House
 Walter F. Burrell House
 George Earle Chamberlain House
 Concord Building, 1891
 Charles Crook House
 Failing Office Building, 1913
 Gilbert Building
 Grand Stable and Carriage Building
 Hamilton Building, 1892–1893
 Richard Koehler House, contributing Alphabet Historic District
 William and Annie MacMaster House
 Mohawk Building
 Multnomah County Courthouse, 1911/1914
 New Imperial Hotel
 Portland City Hall, 1895
 Postal Building, 1900
 Milton W. Smith House
 Stevens Building
 Trevett–Nunn House
 Whidden–Kerr House and Garden
 Isam White House
 Wilcox Building
 Portland Academy school

Other works
 Cloud Cap Inn, Mount Hood (NRHP)
 First National Bank of Hood River

Further reading
Marlitt, Richard. Matters of Proportion: The Portland Residential Architecture of Whidden & Lewis. Portland: Oregon Historical Society Press, 1989.

See also
Doyle & Patterson
Carl L. Linde

References

External links

1889 establishments in Oregon
Defunct architecture firms based in Oregon
History of Portland, Oregon